Christopher Henry Gandy (24 June 1867 – 18 June 1907) was an English first-class cricketer. Gandy was a left-handed batsman who was a left-arm fast-medium bowler.

Gandy made his first-class debut for Hampshire in 1900 against Surrey. Bull's final first-class match for Hampshire came in the same season against Yorkshire. In his short first-class career for Hampshire, Gandy took 4 wickets at an average of 39.00, with best bowling figures of 2/84 against Surrey.

Gandy died in Ingrave, Essex on 18 June 1907.

External links
Christopher Gandy at Cricinfo
Christopher Gandy at CricketArchive

1867 births
1907 deaths
People from Bethnal Green
Cricketers from Greater London
English cricketers
Hampshire cricketers